Dancing in the Sun is the third studio album released by jazz saxophonist George Howard in 1985 on TBA/GRP Records. The album reached No. 1 on the Billboard Traditional Jazz Albums chart.

Overview
"Dancing in the Sun" spent three weeks atop the Billboard Traditional Jazz Albums chart.

Covers
Howard covered Lionel Richie's "Love Will Find a Way" for the album.

Tracklisting
Adapted from album's text.

References

1985 albums
GRP Records albums
George Howard (jazz) albums